Christine Schorn (born 1 February 1944) is a German actress. Schorn has appeared in multiple films and TV shows including Apprehension (1982), According to the Plan (2007) and Das Leben ist nichts für Feiglinge (2012).

Filmography
  Apprehension (1982)
 According to the Plan (2007) 
 Life Is Not for Cowards (2012)
 Someday We'll Tell Each Other Everything (2023)

References

External links
 

German film actresses
German television actresses
21st-century German actresses
20th-century German actresses
Living people
1944 births